Andreas Geipl (born 21 April 1992) is a German professional footballer who plays as a midfielder for 1. FC Heidenheim.

Career 
Geipl played for the youth teams of SC Bad Kohlgrub and TSV 1860 Munich. He made his professional debut for SSV Jahn Regensburg on 26 July 2014 in a 3. Liga match against MSV Duisburg, where Regensburg won 3–1. On 1 June 2016, Geipl extended his contract with Regensburg until 2017.

In summer 2020, he joined 1. FC Heidenheim on a free transfer.

References

External links
 
 

1992 births
Living people
Sportspeople from Garmisch-Partenkirchen
Association football midfielders
German footballers
TSV 1860 Munich II players
SSV Jahn Regensburg players
SSV Jahn Regensburg II players
1. FC Heidenheim players
2. Bundesliga players
3. Liga players
Footballers from Bavaria